Lake Sherburne is located in the Many Glacier region of Glacier National Park, in the U.S. state of Montana. The lake is a reservoir, formed by Lake Sherburne Dam, which impounded Swiftcurrent Creek and was constructed in between 1914 and 1921.  The construction of the dam inundated several small lakes and highly productive riparian and wetland areas, and due to its fluctuating water levels, the surrounding area supports little vegetation.  However, trumpeter swans are often observed along the lake in the spring and fall. The lake stretches nearly  when full. The reservoir is the principal water storage component of the U.S. Bureau of Reclamation's Milk River Project, which provides irrigation water to north central Montana farms.

The name Lake Sherburne is derived from an early settler and businessman in the area, Joseph H. Sherburne. He settled in the area (Browning) in 1896 and was the proprietor of the Sherburne Mercantile Company which had stores in towns in the area Browning, Babb and East Glacier. During this time he had a cabin for summer use by his family on the shore of what became known as Sherburne Lakes (plural). Once the dam was built in 1919 the name was revised to Lake Sherburne.

Fishing along the lake is less than spectacular, but brook trout and northern pike can be caught there.  A boat is generally required for fishing, but since there is no boat dock along the lake, it is usually necessary to park alongside the road and walk down to the lakeshore.

See also

 List of lakes in Glacier County, Montana
 Glacier View Dam, a project proposed in the 1940s

References

Sherburne
Sherburne
Sherburne
Sherburne
Infrastructure completed in 1921